The Chiselville Covered Bridge is a covered bridge over the Roaring Branch of the Batten Kill in Sunderland, Vermont. It bears a sign reading "One Dollar Fine for Driving Faster Than a Walk on This Bridge."

Description and history

The bridge was built 1870 by Daniel Oatman.

It is a lattice truss bridge design, with additional steel I-beams which were installed in 1973 after damage caused by two overweight gravel trucks in 1971.

Popular culture
The bridge was featured in the 1987 film Baby Boom.

See also
List of Vermont covered bridges

References

Bridges completed in 1870
Covered bridges in Vermont
Wooden bridges in Vermont
Bridges in Bennington County, Vermont
Tourist attractions in Bennington County, Vermont
Road bridges in Vermont
Lattice truss bridges in the United States
1870 establishments in Vermont